Sibu Indoor Stadium is an indoor stadium located in Sibu, Sarawak, Malaysia. The stadium is located on the Old Airport Road, Sibu.

History
The ground breaking of the stadium was held on 20 June 2014 by the Second Finance Minister Datuk Seri Wong Soon Koh. The construction of the stadium was completed on 2 April 2016.  The stadium had its soft-opening on 11 July 2016 and was officiated by the State Secretary Tan Sri Datuk Amar Mohd Morshidi Abdul Ghani.

Facilities
The stadium houses eight badminton courts, a basketball court, two volleyball courts, a two-lane jogging track and a grandstand with a seating capacity of 4,250 people. It is also equipped with 479 parking bays for cars, 89 for motorcycles and 16 for stage coaches.

Notable events
Sports and entertainment 
2016 Sukma Games - Badminton
2017 Malaysia Masters Grand Prix Gold
2017 AGE Convention (Artistic, Game and Entertainment)
2017 Borneo International Martial Art Tournament
2017 National Golden Glove Championship 
2018 Sarawak Civil Service Welfare and Recreational Council (Maksak) Volleyball Championship
Karnival Lefestour 2019
Masterpiece "Concert Merindang Ke Bintang 1 Dekad Masterpiece" - 8 December 2019, with a sold-out crowd of 1,500 people.
Stylofest Sibu 2022
17th Sarawak Indoor Archery Championship 2022

Celebrations
2018 Sarawak Youths Day celebration
2020 national-level Malaysia Day celebration
Part of 2022 Borneo Cultural Festival events
 2022 Sarawak Day celebration

 Others
 COVID-19 quarantine centre
 COVID-19 vaccination centre (PPV)

References

Sports venues in Sarawak
Indoor arenas in Malaysia
Badminton venues in Malaysia
Sports venues completed in 2016